Paralecta antistola is a moth in the family Xyloryctidae. It was described by Edward Meyrick in 1930. It is found in Malaysia.

The larvae feed on Eugenia caryophyllata. They bore the stem of their host plant.

References

Paralecta
Taxa named by Edward Meyrick
Moths described in 1930